S Uthuman Ghani (1957– 2 January 2005) was a Singaporean television host, author, poet, humanitarian, philanthropist and lawyer. He is widely considered to be one of the best Tamil television hosts in the world.

Regarding the controversy of his marriage on religious and cultural grounds, he wrote: "One’s quality of life is measured against the background of the society in which he lives. He has to move within the laws and parameters that society has drawn. Anyone who transgresses these is branded as a social enemy. Whether what he does is right or wrong it is the norm of this society to accept what the majority believe in as being right. But I know of the history of people who have gone against these deep-rooted social norms."

References

1957 births
2005 deaths
Singaporean television presenters
Singaporean writers
20th-century Singaporean lawyers